Borøya or Borøy is an island in Tvedestrand municipality in Agder county, Norway.   The  island lies along the Oksefjorden between the islands of Sandøya and Tverrdalsøya.  Some of the villages on the island include Sandvika, Borøkilen, Utgårdstrand, and Snarsund.  The island has about 240 residents (in 2015) and it has one bridge connecting it to the mainland.

Name
Ancient written works often spell the name with an "e" (e.g. Berøy).  The origin of the name could be derived from the Old Norse word beri, bjørn, or bær.

See also
List of islands of Norway

References

External links
Information for local residents of Borøya (Archive)

Tvedestrand
Islands of Agder